Petr Kousalík (born February 7, 1991 in Brno) is a Czech professional ice hockey defenceman. He played with HC Litvínov in the Czech Extraliga during the 2010–11 Czech Extraliga season.

References

External links

1991 births
Czech ice hockey defencemen
HC Litvínov players
Living people
Ice hockey people from Brno
HC Nové Zámky players
HC '05 Banská Bystrica players
Orli Znojmo players
HC Most players
Czech expatriate ice hockey players in Slovakia